Heinz Zünkler (28 September 1929 – 29 July 2018) was a German rower. He competed in the men's eight event at the 1952 Summer Olympics.

References

1929 births
2018 deaths
German male rowers
Olympic rowers of Germany
Rowers at the 1952 Summer Olympics
Rowers from Cologne